Scotinotylus gracilis is a species of spider in the family Linyphiidae (sheet weavers), found in the United States. It was described by Millidge in 1981.

References

Linyphiidae
Spiders of the United States
Spiders described in 1981